Toxic Bachelors is a novel by Danielle Steel, published by Delacorte Press in October 2005. The book is Steel's sixty-seventh novel.

Synopsis
Charlie Harrington, a philanthropist with high expectations in women, Adam Weiss, a celebrity lawyer who likes young, fun women for short-term purposes and Gray Hawk, an artist who is drawn into troubled relationships.

Every year they cruise the Mediterranean on Charlie's yacht together until they each find love. Charlie falls in love with a social worker who is far from his ideal woman. Adam gets involved with a young but smart woman whilst Gray falls for a businesswoman and mother.

As their next cruise together approaches, each man finds himself in a position far from the previous year with new loves and events which will turn the toxic bachelors into loving, caring men forever.

Toxic Bachelors in Pop Culture
The phrase Toxic Bachelor used  coined by Sex and the City writer Candace Bushnell's original "Sex & The City" columns in the New York Observer and used in the first episode: "(Freeze frame, subtitles read: Peter Mason – Advertising Executive – Toxic Batchelor; Aired 06/06/'98.

Footnotes
http://www.randomhouse.com/features/steel/bookshelf/display.pperl?isbn=9780385338271

2005 American novels
American romance novels
Contemporary romance novels
Novels by Danielle Steel
Delacorte Press books